The courts of foreclosure in Turkey are administrative regional courts and are responsible for ordering bailiffs for individual and organisations that do not pay their debts.

See also
 Legal System in the Republic of Turkey

Courts in Turkey